National Trail High School is a public high school in New Paris, Ohio.  It is the only high school in the National Trail Local School district. The district serves students from New Paris Ohio, Eldorado, Ohio, and West Manchester, Ohio, along with all of Jefferson Township, Monroe Township, and Jackson Township. The K-12 school complex is located in the southeastern portion of Jefferson Township,near Eaton, Ohio.

History
The National Trail Local School District was established in 1965 after the consolidation of Jackson, Jefferson, and Monroe High Schools. The schools first graduating class was in 1969. The current High School was built in 1968 serving students from all three townships. The Middle School was housed at the former Monroe High School building and the elementary was housed at the former Jefferson building until 1999 when the district built a new Elementary and Middle school attached to the High School. The district's K-12 complex resides along U.S. Route 40, near I 70. The Jefferson township building housed a portion of the New Paris police department and other amenities until it was demolished in 2020, adding area for the Village of New Paris community Park.

Clubs and Activities
Marching Band and Concert Band
Art Club
Renaissance Club
Drama Club
FCCLA
Foreign Language Club
Quiz Bowl
Science Olympiad 
National Honor Society
Student Council

FFA
National Trail's FFA chapter is nationally recognized by their competition success and agricultural opportunity. NT has a rich history at the state and local level, competing in and winning numerous FFA state competitions. 75% of the student population partake in FFA. The organization provides opportunity for students to develop skills in leadership, personal growth, and career success through agriculture education.

Steel Band
National Trail is one of the few schools in the state of Ohio to have a Steel Band. The 'Advanced' Steel band will travel to play at area festivals and community events.

Athletics
National Trail was a member of the Cross County Conference for 42 years (1978-2020), capturing over 55 league titles during that time, before joining the Western Ohio Athletic Conference in the fall of 2021, along with county rivals Tri-County North High School and Twin Valley South High School. 

The golf team plays their home matches at Highland Lake Golf Course. The Swim team hosts meets at the Preble County YMCA.

Sports Fielded  
Football
Girls Soccer 
Boys and Girls Cross Country
Volleyball
Boys and Girls Golf
Boys and Girls Basketball
Wrestling
Cheerleading
Swimming
Baseball
Softball
Boys and Girls Track and Field

OHSAA State Runner-Up
 Girls Softball - 1986

OHSAA State Final Four
 Girls Volleyball - 1996 
 Girls Cross Country - 1989 (3rd place as a team)
 Boys Cross Country - 1966 (4th place as a team)
 Boys Baseball - 1963

Staff
 The Current Superintendent of the school district is Mr. Robert O. Fischer (Predecessors: Jeff Parker and Clint Moore)
 The current principal of the high school is Michael J. Eyler. (Predecessors: Brian McKnight, Robert O. Fischer, Michael Harrison, and Mark Wiseman) Mrs. Jennifer Couch (Middle School) and Mr. Ed Eales (Elementary) currently administer the lower grades of the school.

Notable alumni
 Travis Miller, Former MLB player (Minnesota Twins)

References

External links
 District Website

Educational institutions established in 1968
Educational institutions established in 1969
High schools in Preble County, Ohio
Public high schools in Ohio